Bushman's Revenge is a Norwegian jazz and progressive rock band.

Career 
Bushman's Revenge mix rock and jazz. On the album Jitterbug (2010) Ståle Storløkken appears on two tracks. Ola Kvernberg and Kjetil Møster appeared with Bushman's Revenge at Moldejazz 2012, and  Kjetil Møster and David Wallumrød at Kongsberg Jazzfestival 2013.

John Kelman of All About Jazz named the Bushman's Revenge concert at Moldejazz July 2013 one of his 25 Best Live Shows of 2013.

Band members 
Even Helte Hermansen – guitar
Rune Nergaard – bass 
Gard Nilssen – drums

Discography 
 2007: Cowboy Music (Jazzaway)
 2009: You Lost Me at Hello (Rune Grammofon)
 2010: Jitterbug (Rune Grammofon)
 2012: A Little Bit of Big Bonanza (Rune Grammofon)
 2012: Never Mind the Botox (Rune Grammofon)
 2013: Thou Shalt Boogie! (Rune Grammofon)
 2013: Electric Komle – Live! (Rune Grammofon)
 2016: Jazz, Fritt Etter Hukommelsen (Rune Grammofon)
 2016: Bushman's Fire LP (Rune Grammofon)
 2019: Et hån mot overklassen (Hubro Music)

References 

Norwegian post-rock groups
Norwegian jazz ensembles
Norwegian experimental musical groups
Norwegian rock music groups
Musical groups established in 2003
Musical groups from Trondheim
Rune Grammofon artists